Eva Renate Reich (27 April 1924 – 10 August 2008) developed a type of infant massage.

Reich was the eldest child of Annie Pink and Wilhelm Reich, who was a well-known psychoanalyst who studied with Sigmund Freud. Reich was born in Vienna and moved to America in 1938 at the age of 14 and then studied at Barnard College and then a medical degree from Women's Medical College of Pennsylvania and went on to marry William Moise, who she divorced in 1974. Reich continued some of her father's work and found recognition for her energy massage during the New Age movements of the 1960s. Reich retired in 1992 and suffered a series of strokes before her death in 2008 at the age of 84.

References

1924 births
2008 deaths
20th-century American women scientists
21st-century American women scientists
American people of Ukrainian-Jewish descent
American people of Austrian-Jewish descent